The 1870 Bridgnorth by-election was fought on 16 February 1870.  The by-election was fought due to the resignation of the incumbent Conservative MP  Henry Whitmore.  It was won by the unopposed Liberal candidate William Henry Foster.  The Liberals would hold their gain at the 1874 general election.

References

1870 elections in the United Kingdom
1870 in England
19th century in Shropshire
Bridgnorth
By-elections to the Parliament of the United Kingdom in Shropshire constituencies
Unopposed by-elections to the Parliament of the United Kingdom in English constituencies
February 1870 events